These are the official results of the women's 200 metres event at the 1992 Summer Olympics in Barcelona, Spain. There were a total number of 52 participating athletes, with seven qualifying heats.

Medalists

Records
These were the standing world and Olympic records (in seconds) prior to the 1992 Summer Olympics.

Final

Semifinals

Quarterfinals

Heats

See also
 1988 Women's Olympic 200 metres (Seoul)
 1990 Women's European Championships 200 metres (Split)
 1991 Women's World Championships 200 metres (Tokyo)
 1993 Women's World Championships 200 metres (Stuttgart)
 1994 Women's European Championships 200 metres (Helsinki)

References

External links
 Official Report
 Results

 
200 metres at the Olympics
1992 in women's athletics
Women's events at the 1992 Summer Olympics